The 1999 WGC-NEC Invitational was a golf tournament that was contested from August 26–29, 1999 over the South Course at Firestone Country Club in Akron, Ohio. It was the first WGC-NEC Invitational tournament, and was the second of the three World Golf Championships that were held in the series' inaugural year. The Invitational succeeded the World Series of Golf which had been played at Firestone from 1976 until 1998.

World number 1 Tiger Woods won the tournament, shooting a 62 (-8) in the third round on his way to a one-stroke victory over Phil Mickelson.

Field
1. 1999 United States and European Ryder Cup teams
United States: David Duval (2), Jim Furyk (2), Tom Lehman, Justin Leonard (2), Davis Love III (2), Jeff Maggert, Phil Mickelson (2), Mark O'Meara (2), Steve Pate, Payne Stewart, Hal Sutton, Tiger Woods (2)
Europe: Darren Clarke, Andrew Coltart, Sergio García, Pádraig Harrington, Miguel Ángel Jiménez, Paul Lawrie, Colin Montgomerie, José María Olazábal, Jesper Parnevik, Jarmo Sandelin, Jean van de Velde, Lee Westwood

2. 1998 United States and International Presidents Cup teams
United States: Mark Calcavecchia, Fred Couples, Scott Hoch, John Huston, Lee Janzen
International: Stuart Appleby, Steve Elkington, Ernie Els, Carlos Franco, Shigeki Maruyama, Frank Nobilo, Greg Norman, Naomichi Ozaki, Craig Parry, Nick Price, Vijay Singh, Greg Turner

Round summaries

First round

Second round

Third round

Final round

External links
Full results

WGC Invitational
WGC-NEC Invitational
WGC-NEC Invitational
WGC-NEC Invitational